Sudan first participated at the Olympic Games in 1960, and has sent athletes to compete in most Summer Olympic Games since then.  The nation did not attend the 1964 Games, boycotted the 1976 Summer Olympics along with most African nations, and participated in the American-led boycott of the 1980 Summer Olympics.  The nation has never participated in the Winter Olympic Games.

Ismail Ahmed Ismail, who came second in the men's 800 m in 2008, was the first Sudanese athlete to win an Olympic medal.

The National Olympic Committee for Sudan was created in 1956 and recognized by the International Olympic Committee in 1959.

Medals by Summer Games

Medals by sport

List of medalists

See also
 List of flag bearers for Sudan at the Olympics
 :Category:Olympic competitors for Sudan

External links
 
 
 

 
Olympics